La Nouvelle République may refer to:

 La Nouvelle République du Centre-Ouest (Tours, France)
 La Nouvelle République des Pyrénées (Tarbes, France)

See also
 République (disambiguation)
 New Republic (disambiguation)
 République (disambiguation)
 Republic (disambiguation)